Morgan Scott Grim (born 7 November 1988) is an American professional basketball player who currently plays for the Uni Baskets Paderborn of the German ProA League.

References

External links
Profile at Paderborn Baskets Website
Eurobasket.com Profile
Utah State Bio

1988 births
Living people
Utah State Aggies men's basketball players
Centers (basketball)
American men's basketball players
Basketball players from Salt Lake City